Chionoxantha is a genus of moths of the family Erebidae. The genus was erected by George Hampson in 1914.

Species
Chionoxantha leucophaea Hampson, 1916
Chionoxantha margarita Brandt, 1938
Chionoxantha staudingeri Standfuss, 1892
Chionoxantha trophotalis Hampson, 1908

References

Acontiinae